Damien Wilkins (born 1963 Lower Hutt, New Zealand) is a New Zealand novelist, short story writer, and poet. He is the director of the International Institute of Modern Letters at Victoria University of Wellington.

Life
He was graduated from Victoria University of Wellington in 1984. He was assistant editor at Victoria University Press in 1988. He graduated from Washington University in St. Louis with an MFA. Since 1992 he has been a writing tutor in Wellington, New Zealand. His notable doctoral students have included Pip Adam, Michalia Arathimos, and Gigi Fenster. 

Since 2014 he has been the director of the International Institute of Modern Letters at Victoria University of Wellington. 

His work has appeared in Sport.

He is also a singer and songwriter who has released songs through his project the Close Readers. Previously, he had played in the band the Jonahs in the 1980s.

Awards
 1989 Heinemann Reed Fiction Award
 1992 Whiting Award
 1994 New Zealand Book Award for Fiction
 2013 Arts Foundation of New Zealand Laureate Award
 2020 Young Adult Fiction Award, New Zealand Book Awards for Children and Young Adults

Works

Novels

Little Masters Wellington, New Zealand: Victoria University Press, 1996

Nineteen Windows under Ash. Wellington, New Zealand: Victoria University Press, 2000. .

The Fainter. Wellington, New Zealand: Victoria University Press, 2006. .
Somebody Loves Us All. Wellington, New Zealand: Victoria University Press, 2009. .
Max Gate. Wellington, New Zealand: Victoria University Press, 2013. .
 Dad Art. Wellington, New Zealand: Victoria University Press, 2016. .
 Lifting. Wellington, New Zealand: Victoria University Press, 2017. .
 Aspiring. Auckland, New Zealand: Massey University Press, 2020.

Short stories

Poetry

Anthologies

Plays and scripts 

 Duggan. Television series.
 Insiders Guide to Happiness. Television series.
 Drinking Games. Stage play.

Editor 

 Great Sporting Moments: The best of Sport magazine 1988-2004, Victoria University Press, 2005.

Albums
Group Hug (Austin, 2011)
The Lines Are Open (Austin, 2014)

References

External links
Profile at The Whiting Foundation

1963 births
New Zealand male novelists
Victoria University of Wellington alumni
Living people
Academic staff of the Victoria University of Wellington
People from Lower Hutt
20th-century New Zealand novelists
21st-century New Zealand novelists
Washington University in St. Louis alumni